Imperial County is a county located on the southeast border of the U.S. state of California. As of the 2020 census, the population was 179,702, making it the least populous county in Southern California. The county seat is El Centro. Imperial is the most recent California county to be established, as it was created in 1907 out of portions of San Diego County.

Imperial County is located in the far southeast of California, in the Imperial Valley. It borders San Diego County to the west, Riverside County to the north, the U.S. state of Arizona to the east and the Mexican state of Baja California to the south. It includes the El Centro Metropolitan Statistical Area and is part of the Southern California border region, the smallest but most economically diverse region in the state.

This is supported by irrigation, with water supplied wholly from the Colorado River via the All-American Canal.

The Imperial Valley straddles the border between the United States and Mexico. Imperial County is strongly influenced by Mexican culture. Approximately 80% of the county's population is Hispanic, with the vast majority being of Mexican origin. The remainder of the population is predominantly non-Hispanic white, in addition to smaller African American, Native American, and Asian minorities.

History

Spanish explorer Melchor Díaz was one of the first Europeans to visit the area of the Imperial Valley in 1540. The explorer Juan Bautista de Anza also explored the area in 1776.

Decades later, after the Mexican–American War, the northern half of the valley was annexed in 1848 by the U.S., while the southern half remained under Mexican rule. Small-scale settlement in natural aquifer areas had occurred in the early 19th century (the present-day site of Mexicali), but most permanent settlement (Americans on the U.S. side, Mexicans on the other side) was after 1900.

In 1905, torrential rainfall in the American Southwest caused the Colorado River (the only drainage for the region) to flood, including canals that had been built to irrigate the Imperial Valley. Since the valley is partially below sea level, the waters never fully receded, but collected in the Salton Sink in what is now called the Salton Sea.

Imperial County was formed in 1907 from the eastern portion of San Diego County. The county was named for Imperial Valley. This had been named for the Imperial Land Company, a subsidiary of the California Development Company, which at the turn of the 20th century had claimed the southern portion of the Colorado Desert for agriculture. The Imperial Land Company also owned extensive lands in Mexico (Baja California). Its objective was to develop commercial crop farming.

By 1910, the land company had managed to settle and develop thousands of farms on both sides of the border. The Mexican Revolution soon after severely disrupted the company's plans. Rival Mexican armies affiliated with different ethnicities killed nearly 10,000 farmers and their families in northern Mexico. Not until the 1920s was the other side of California in the United States sufficiently peaceful and prosperous for the company to earn a return for a large percentage of Mexicans. Some chose to stay and create roots in newly developed communities in the valley.

During the Great Depression and the Dust Bowl, the county attracted migrating "Okies" from drought-ridden farms on the plains by the need of migrant labor. More prosperous job-seekers also arrived from across the U.S. in the 1930s and 1940s. American entry into World War II stimulated the growth of jobs and need to expanded agriculture, and the All American Canal was completed from its source, the Colorado River, to Imperial Valley from 1948 to 1951. By the 1950 census, more than 50,000 residents lived in Imperial County alone, about 40 times the population of 1910. Most of the population was year-round, but would increase every winter by migrant laborers from Mexico. Until the 1960s, the farms in Imperial County provided substantial economic returns to the company and the valley.

During the Great Recession of 2008–11, El Centro had one of the highest unemployment rates (above 30–34%) in the U.S. In the early 2020s, Imperial ranks as one of California's poorest counties. It has a lower median household income than either the state or national medians.

Sites of interest

Fort Yuma
Fort Yuma is located on the banks of the Colorado River in Winterhaven, California. It was to defend the newly settled community of Yuma, Arizona on the other side of the Colorado River and the nearby Mexican border. In March 1851 the post was moved to a small elevation on the Colorado's west bank, opposite the present city of Yuma, Arizona, on the site of the former Mission Puerto de Purísima Concepción. This site had been occupied by Camp Calhoun, named for John C. Calhoun, established in 1849. Fort Yuma was established to protect the southern emigrant travel route to California and to attempt control of the Yuma Indians in the surrounding  area.

Blue Angels
NAF El Centro is the winter home of the U.S. Navy Flight Demonstration Squadron, The Blue Angels. NAF El Centro historically kicks off the Blue Angels' season with their first air show, traditionally held in March.

Imperial Valley Expo & Fairgrounds
The city of Imperial is home to the California Mid-Winter Fair and Fiesta which is the local county fair, held in late February to early March.

Algodones Sand Dunes
 The name Algodones Dunes refers to the entire geographic feature, while the administrative designation for that portion managed by the Bureau of Land Management is the "Imperial Sand Dunes Recreation Area" (sometimes called the "Glamis Dunes"). The Algodones Sand Dunes are the largest mass of sand dunes in California. This dune system extends for more than  along the eastern edge of the Imperial Valley agricultural region in a band averaging  in width. A major east–west route of the Union Pacific railroad skirts the eastern edge. The dune system is divided into three areas. The northernmost area is known as Mammoth Wash. South of Mammoth Wash is the North Algodones Dunes Wilderness established by the 1994 California Desert Protection Act. This area is closed to motorized use and access is by hiking and horseback. The largest and most heavily used area begins at Highway 78 and continues south just past Interstate 8. The expansive dune formations offer picturesque scenery, a chance to view rare plants and animals, and a playground for ATV and off-roading enthusiasts. The dunes are also popular in film making and have been the site for movies such as Return of the Jedi.

Colorado River
The natural course of the river flows from north of Grand Lake, Colorado, into the Gulf of California. For many months out of the year, however, no water actually flows from the United States to the gulf, due to human use. The river is a popular destination for water sports, including fishing, boating, water skiing, and jet skiing.

Salvation Mountain

Salvation Mountain (location ) is an artificial mountain north of Calipatria, California, near Slab City. It is made from adobe, straw, and thousands of gallons of paint. It was created by Leonard Knight to convey the message that "God Loves Everyone". Knight refused substantial donations of money and labor from supporters who wished to modify his message of universal love to favor or disfavor particular groups.

Anza-Borrego Desert State Park

Anza-Borrego Desert State Park, portions of which are located in Imperial County, is the largest state park in California.  of dirt roads, twelve wilderness areas, and many more miles of hiking trails provide visitors with an unparalleled opportunity to experience the wonders of the Colorado Desert. The park's name is a combination of the last name of Spanish explorer Juan Bautista de Anza, and the Spanish word for bighorn sheep,  borrego. The park features many sweeping vistas, washes (wadis), rocky outcrops, boulder-strewn hillsides, in addition to the vast expanses of sandy desert; in springtime (especially after periods of rain), these areas appear to change shape, as they come alive with blooming wildflowers, flowering and fruiting cacti and numerous other species of native flora. Fauna that visitors may also have the chance to see include the bobcat, coyote, golden eagle, kit fox, mule deer, mountain lion, red-tailed hawk  and roadrunner, as well as the iconic desert subspecies of bighorn sheep (formerly more common, across the southwest U.S. and northern Mexico). Many varied reptile species call the area home, such as the banded gecko, chuckwalla, desert iguana, desert tortoise, desert sidewinder, gopher snake, kingsnake, red diamond rattlesnake and the rosy boa.

Fossil Canyon and Painted Gorge
Located near Ocotillo, California in the Coyote Mountains, Fossil Canyon  (and the surrounding area) is a great place for rock-hounding and fossil hunting. The fossils here are not necessarily of dinosaurs; more commonly found are ancient oyster and seashell, coral, and other marine life from the prehistoric Miocene epoch, when the entire area was submerged as part of the Western Interior Seaway.

The Painted Gorge, located on the eastern side of the Coyote Mountains, consists of sedimentary, metamorphic and igneous rock; Heat and movement over time has created fantastic shapes and colors. Dark ochre, iron-reds, royal purples, and mauves (mixed with dark browns/black) create a palette of color as the sun illuminates and plays shadows upon this geologic wonder.

Imperial NWR

The Imperial National Wildlife Refuge protects wildlife habitat along  of the lower Colorado River in Arizona and California, including the last un-channeled section before the river enters Mexico. The river and its associated backwater lakes and wetlands are a green oasis, contrasting with the surrounding desert mountains. It is a refuge and breeding area for migratory birds and local desert wildlife.

Sonny Bono Salton Sea NWR
Because of its southern latitude, elevation, and location in the Colorado Desert, the refuge experiences some of the highest temperatures in the nation. Daily temperatures from May to October generally exceed  with temperatures of  recorded yearly.

Museum of History in Granite 
A unique attraction of the town of Felicity is the Museum of History in Granite. The museum exhibits granite monuments made from Missouri Red Granite. Subjects include a Korean War Memorial, History of Arizona, The Wall for the Ages, the eight monument History of Humanity, and the History of the United States of America. Smaller monuments include the Felicity Stone (sm), a Rosetta Stone for the future located at the center of the History of Humanity monuments.

Geography

Much of Imperial County is below sea level. Imperial County is roughly twice the size in total square miles as the State of Delaware.

The county is in the Colorado Desert, an extension of the larger Sonoran Desert.

The Colorado River forms the county's eastern boundary.

In this region, the geology is dominated by the transition of the tectonic plate boundary from rift to fault. The southernmost strands of the San Andreas Fault connect the northernmost extensions of the East Pacific Rise. Consequently, the region is subject to earthquakes, and the crust is being stretched, resulting in a sinking of the terrain over time. Related to the active geology are some interesting hydrothermal features.

National protected areas
 Cibola National Wildlife Refuge (part)
 Imperial National Wildlife Refuge (part)
 Sonny Bono Salton Sea National Wildlife Refuge

Demographics

2011

Places by population, race, and income

2010

The 2010 United States Census reported that Imperial County had a population of 174,528. The racial makeup of Imperial County was 102,553 (58.8%) White, 5,773 (3.3%) African American, 3,059 (1.8%) Native American, 2,843 (1.6%) Asian, 165 (0.1%) Pacific Islander, 52,413 (30.0%) from other races, and 7,722 (4.4%) from two or more races. Hispanic or Latino of any race were 140,271 persons (80.4%).

2000
As of the census of 2000, there were 142,361 people, 39,384 households, and 31,467 families residing in the county. The racial makeup of the county was 49.4% White, 4.0% Black or African American, 1.9% Native American, 2.0% Asian, 0.1% Pacific Islander, 39.1% from other races, and 3.7% from two or more races. 72.2% of the population were Hispanic or Latino of any race. 65.7% spoke Spanish at home, while 32.3% spoke only English.

There were 39,384 households, out of which 46.7% had children under the age of 18 living with them, 57.7% were married couples living together, 17.1% had a female householder with no husband present, and 20.1% were non-families. 17.1% of all households were made up of individuals, and 8.1% had someone living alone who was 65 years of age or older. The average household size was 3.33 and the average family size was 3.77.

In the county, the population was spread out, with 31.4% under the age of 18, 9.9% from 18 to 24, 30.4% from 25 to 44, 18.2% from 45 to 64, and 10.0% who were 65 years of age or older. The median age was 31 years. For every 100 females there were 109.3 males. For every 100 females age 18 and over, there were 111.4 males.

The median income for a household in the county was $31,870, and the median income for a family was $35,226. Males had a median income of $32,775 versus $23,974 for females. The per capita income for the county was $13,239. About 19.4% of families and 22.6% of the population were below the poverty line, including 28.7% of those under age 18 and 13.6% of those age 65 or over.

Imperial County has the lowest per capita income of any county in Southern California and among the bottom five counties in the state.

By 2006 the population had risen to 160,201, the population growth rate since the year 2000 was 30%, the highest in California and fifth highest in the United States in the time period. High levels of immigration, new residents search for affordable homes, and a search for retirement homes can explain the population increase.

Government
The county is governed by the Imperial County Board of Supervisors, a five-member board elected by districts. Supervisors serve four-year terms. Other elected county officials include the Assessor, Auditor-Controller, District Attorney, County Clerk-Recorder, Public Administrator, Sheriff-Coroner, and Treasurer-Tax Collector. The county is run on a day-to-day basis by the County Executive Officer, who is currently Robin Hodgkin, on an interim basis. The county is advised as to legal matters by the County Counsel, who is currently Katherine K. Turner.

Politics

Voter registration statistics

Cities by population and voter registration

Overview 
Previously strongly Republican, Imperial County is now a Democratic stronghold in presidential, congressional and local elections. The last Republican to win a majority in the county was George H. W. Bush in 1988.

  
  
  
  
  
  
  
  
  
  
  
  
  
  
  
  
  
  
  
  
  
  
  
  
  
  
  

On November 4, 2008, Imperial County voted 69.7% for Proposition 8, which amended the California Constitution to ban same-sex marriages, showing more support for the proposition than any other strongly Democratic county. After Prop 8 was declared unconstitutional by a lower federal court, Imperial County continued to defend Proposition 8 in the federal judicial system. However, on February 6, 2012, the United States Court of Appeals for the Ninth Circuit denied Imperial County legal standing in the case Hollingsworth v. Perry.

Crime 

The following table includes the number of incidents reported and the rate per 1,000 persons for each type of offense.

Cities by population and crime rates

Economy
Thousands of acres of prime farmland have transformed the desert into one of the most productive farming regions in California with an annual crop production of over $1 billion. Agriculture is the largest industry in Imperial County and accounts for 48% of all employment.

A vast system of canals, check dams, and pipelines carry the water all over the valley, a system which forms the Imperial Irrigation District, or IID. The number of canal and pipeline branches number roughly over a hundred. Imported water and a long growing season allow two crop cycles each year, and the Imperial Valley is a major source of winter fruits and vegetables, cotton, and grain for U.S. and international markets. Alfalfa is another major crop produced in the Imperial Valley. The agricultural lands are served by a constructed agricultural drain system, which conveys surface runoff and subsurface drainage from fields to the Salton Sea, which is a designated repository for agricultural runoff. Imperial County produces nearly 2/3 of all vegetables consumed by Americans during the winter.

El Centro is the commercial center of Imperial County. Fifty percent of the jobs in El Centro come from the service and retail sector.

A recent growth in the interest of Imperial County as a filming location, has spurred growth in servicing this industry. Because of the county's desert environment and proximity to Los Angeles, California, movies are sometimes filmed in the sand dunes outside the agricultural portions of the county. These have included Return of the Jedi, Stargate, The Scorpion King, and Into the Wild. Additionally, portions of the 2005 film Jarhead were filmed here because of its similarity to the desert terrain of Iraq.

In 2016, Imperial County had the highest unemployment rate of any county in the United States, at 23.5%.

Cotton in Imperial County and Riverside is predominantly Bt cotton. This is in contrast to the rest of the state, which largely relies on non-incorporated pesticides. The introduction of Bt cotton has dramatically reduced pesticide use here.

Renewable energy source
Imperial Valley has become a hotbed of renewable energy projects, both solar and geothermal. This is driven in part by California's mandate to generate 20% of its power from renewable sources by the end of 2010, the valley's excellent sun resources, the high unemployment, its proximity to large population centers on the coast, and large tracts of otherwise unusable desert land. Much of the land suitable for green energy is owned by the federal government (Bureau of Land Management). Almost all of these are planned for the Imperial Valley and the desert region north of the valley. Stirling Energy is currently building one of the world's largest solar thermal plants,  with 38,000 "sun catchers," it will power up to 600,000 homes once it is fully operational by around 2015. CalEnergy currently runs a geothermal plant that generates enough power for 300,000 homes and could tap into more for up to 2.5 million homes.

Transportation

Major highways

 Interstate 8
 State Route 7
 State Route 78
 State Route 86
 State Route 98
 State Route 111
 State Route 115
 State Route 186

Imperial County is at the junction of one interstate, and three state highways. Radiating to the east and west are connections to the Arizona Sun Corridor and San Diego-Tijuana metropolitan area via Interstate 8, Blythe, and northern San Diego County via State Route 78, the Mexicali Valley via State Route 111, and the Coachella Valley, Inland Empire, and Los Angeles metropolitan area via State Route 86.

Public transportation

Imperial County is served by Greyhound Lines and Imperial Valley Transit buses. Through a partnership between Imperial County Transportation Commission (ICTC), the Yuma County Intergovernmental Public Transportation Authority (YCIPTA), and the Quechan Indian Tribe, Yuma County Area Transit buses serve portions of Imperial County and connects it to Yuma, Arizona. Amtrak trains on the Sunset Limited and Texas Eagle route also travel through the county, but with no scheduled stops; the nearest stop is in Yuma, Arizona.

Airports

County owned
 Imperial County Airport, the county's main airport, is primarily a general aviation facility. It is located just north of El Centro, and has limited commercial flight service subsidized by the Essential Air Service program.

Municipal ownership
 Brawley Municipal Airport is a public use general aviation airport, owned by and located in Brawley.
 Calexico Airport is a public use general aviation field, owned by and located in Calexico. It used in part to service maquiladora factories in nearby Mexicali.
 Cliff Hatfield Memorial Airport is a public use general aviation airport, owned by and located in Calipatria.

Privately owned
 Salton Sea Airport is a public use general aviation airport located in Salton City.
 Douthitt Strip Airport is a private use facility in El Centro. It was formerly a military airfield.

Military
 Naval Air Facility El Centro is a U.S. Navy airfield in El Centro.

Communities

Cities

Brawley
Calexico
Calipatria
El Centro (county seat)
Holtville
Imperial
Westmorland

Census-designated places

Bombay Beach
Desert Shores
El Centro NAF
Heber
Niland
Ocotillo
Palo Verde
Salton Sea Beach
Salton City
Seeley
Winterhaven

Unincorporated communities

Alamorio
Andrade
Bard
Bonds Corner
Boulder Park
Coyote Wells
Date City
Dixieland
Felicity
Glamis
Kane Spring
Meloland
Mount Signal
Munyon
Obregon
Perrys Corner
Picacho
Plaster City
Rockwood
Ross Corner
Sandia
Slab City

Former settlements

 Bradtmoore
 Camp Gaston
 Carrizo Creek Station
 Hedges
 Indian Wells
 Jaeger City
 Ogilby
 Pilot Knob Station
 Potholes
 Sackett's Wells
 Shamrock
 Silsbee
 Tumco

Indian Reservations

Fort Yuma Indian Reservation (partially in Yuma County, Arizona)
Torres-Martinez Indian Reservation (partially in Riverside County)

Population ranking

The population ranking of the following table is based on the 2010 census of Imperial County.

† county seat

Area codes

442/760 – Covers all of the El Centro metropolitan area as well as Palm Springs, Oceanside, Bishop, Ridgecrest, Barstow, and Needles; northern San Diego County; and southeastern California, including much of the Mojave Desert and the Owens Valley. Area code 760 split from area code 619 on March 22, 1997, and was overlaid with area code 442 in 2009.

In popular culture

As a filming location
Scenes for the 2006 film Borat: Cultural Learnings of America for Make Benefit Glorious Nation of Kazakhstan were filmed in Imperial County, but were not used in the finished film.
The majority of Jarhead and The Salton Sea were filmed in the Imperial Valley.
Scenes from Top Gun were filmed at Naval Air Facility El Centro 
American Sniper was filmed in El Centro in fall 2014.
Scenes from Jumanji: The Next Level were filmed in Imperial Dunes the spring of 2019.

Cultural references
Part of Independence Day takes place in the Imperial Valley.
Tucson-based indie rock band Calexico is named after Calexico.
The 2009 nonfiction book Imperial by William T. Vollmann documents the history and culture of Imperial County. A companion volume of photographs was published August 18, 2009.
The Sons of Anarchy spin-off Mayans MC takes place in Santo Padre, a fictional town in Imperial County.
The video game Grand Theft Auto V features a county named Blaine County, which is based on Imperial County.
In the 1963 film, It's a Mad, Mad, Mad, Mad World, Ethel Merman's character is heard talking on a phone to her son, saying that she was "in some place called Plaster City." Plaster City is an unincorporated community in Imperial County.

Education
School districts are:

Unified:

 Calexico Unified School District
 Calipatria Unified School District
 Coachella Valley Unified School District
 Holtville Unified School District
 Imperial Unified School District
 San Pasqual Valley Unified School District

Secondary:
 Brawley Union High School District
 Central Union High School District

Elementary:

 Brawley Elementary School District
 El Centro Elementary School District
 Heber Elementary School District
 Magnolia Union Elementary School District
 McCabe Union Elementary School District
 Meadows Union Elementary School District
 Mulberry Elementary School District
 Seeley Union Elementary School District
 Westmorland Union Elementary School District

See also 
 Niland Geyser
National Register of Historic Places listings in Imperial County, California
 Southern Border Region (California)
 Walters Camp

Notes

References

External links

Imperial Irrigation District
Imperial Valley Economic Development Corporation
Statistical profile of Imperial County, California

 
California counties
Imperial Valley
Counties in Southern California
1907 establishments in California
Populated places established in 1907
 
Majority-minority counties in California
Hispanic and Latino American culture in California